Dongchangfu is a district of the city of Liaocheng, Shandong province, China. It is administered by Liaocheng.

Administrative divisions
As 2012, this District is divided to 10 subdistricts, 8 towns and 2 townships.
Subdistricts

Towns

Townships
Xuying Township
Zhulaozhuang Township

References

External links
 Official home page

Dongchangfu
Liaocheng